The National Defense University (NDU) is an institution of higher education funded by the United States Department of Defense, intended to facilitate high-level education, training, and professional development of national security leaders. As a chairman's Controlled Activity, NDU operates under the guidance of the Chairman of the Joint Chiefs of Staff (CJCS), with Lieutenant General Michael T. Plehn, USAF, as president. It is located on the grounds of Fort Lesley J. McNair in Washington, D.C.

Location

The university is located at Fort Leslie McNair, almost in the heart of Washington, near the White House and the US Congress. Read More

Components

The National Defense University includes:
Colleges and schools
College of International Security Affairs
Dwight D. Eisenhower School for National Security and Resource Strategy (The Eisenhower School), formerly the Industrial College of the Armed Forces
College of Information and Cyberspace (formerly Information Resources Management College or "iCollege")
Joint Forces Staff College
National War College
Programs
 CAPSTONE
KEYSTONE
PINNACLE
Research centers
Institute for National Strategic Studies
Center for Strategic Research
Center for the Study of Chinese Military Affairs
Center for the Study of Weapons of Mass Destruction
Program for Emerging Leaders
Countering Weapons of Mass Destruction Graduate Fellowship Program
NDU Press
Center for Applied Strategic Learning
NDU Libraries

Acceptance rate & Admissions 

Read More

Research institutes and centers 

 Institute of National Strategic Studies;
 Center for Strategic Studies;
 Center for the Study of Military Affairs of China;
 Center for the Study of Weapons of Mass Destruction;
 Press of the National University of Defense (the university publishes 1,300 periodicals)[5];
 Center for applied strategic training;
 Center for joint and strategic logistics.
 The university has a scientific and reference library, the funds of which are open to all students and teachers. Read More

Associated organizations 
NDU Board of Visitors
National Defense University Foundation
United States Institute of Peace 
Consortium of Universities of the Washington Metropolitan Area

Publications
The NDU Press supports education, research, and outreach as the university's cross-component, professional military, and academic publishing house. Publications include the journals Joint Force Quarterly (JFQ) and PRISM, books such as Strategic Assessment 2020, case studies, policy briefs, and strategic monographs.

List of presidents

See also

 Air University (United States Air Force), Alabama
 Defense Acquisition University, Fort Belvoir, Virginia
 National Intelligence University, Washington, D.C.
 NATO Defense College, Rome, Italy 
 Naval Postgraduate School, Monterey, California
 Naval War College, Newport, Rhode Island
 U.S. Army War College, Carlisle, Pennsylvania

References

External links

National Defense University publications on the Internet Archive
US National Defense University Location, History, Structure, and acceptance rate

 
Educational institutions established in 1976
Military education and training in the United States
Universities and colleges in Washington, D.C.
1976 establishments in Washington, D.C.
Southwest Waterfront